Andy Miki (1918–1982) was an Inuk artist from Arviat, Northwest Territories (now Nunavut).

Early life 
Miki was born in 1918 near the Kazan River.

Career 
His works are mainly in soapstone, and are often geometric abstractions.

While the abstract work of John Pangnark focused on the human figure, Miki's work is minimalist abstracted animals. This is partly because the stone available near Arviat is hard and difficult to work with, which necessitates simple designs. Animals depicted in his work include arctic hares, caribou, polar bears, muskox, birds, and dogs.

His work is held by a variety of museums, including the University of Michigan Museum of Art, the Montreal Museum of Fine Arts, the Art Gallery of Guelph, the Canadian Museum of History, the Lowe Art Museum, the Montreal Museum of Fine Arts, and the Penn Museum.

His disc number was E1-436.

Miki died in December 1982.

Works
 Mating Polar Bears, 1967. Sold for 27,600 dollars Canadian in 2006.

Citations

References

 

1918 births
1983 deaths
Inuit sculptors
Inuit from the Northwest Territories
People from Arviat
Artists from Nunavut
20th-century sculptors
Animal artists
Canadian male sculptors